Frederick Jackman (15 May 1841 – 5 September 1891) was an English first-class cricketer. Jackman was a right-handed batsman who bowled right-arm roundarm fast.

Jackman represented Hampshire in two first-class matches, the first of which came in 1875 against Kent. Jackman's second and final first-class match came in 1877 against Derbyshire.

Jackman died at Horndean, Hampshire on 5 September 1891.

External links
Frederick Jackman at Cricinfo
Frederick Jackman at CricketArchive

1841 births
1891 deaths
People from Fareham
English cricketers
Hampshire cricketers
People from Horndean